Grover Carr Furr III (born April 3, 1944) is an American professor of Medieval English literature at Montclair State University who is best known for his revisionist and negationist views regarding the Soviet Union and Joseph Stalin. Furr has written books, papers, and articles about Soviet history, especially the Stalin era, in which he has claimed that the Holodomor was a hoax invented by Ukrainian Nazi collaborationists, that the Katyn massacre was committed by the Nazi Schutzstaffel and not the Soviet NKVD, that all defendants in the Moscow Trials were guilty of what they had been charged with, that claims in Nikita Khrushchev's 1956 "Secret Speech" are almost entirely false, that the purpose of the Molotov–Ribbentrop Pact was to preserve the Second Polish Republic rather than partition it, and that the Soviet Union did not invade Poland in September 1939, on the grounds that the Polish state no longer existed.

Career
Born in Washington, D.C., Furr graduated in 1965 from McGill University in Montreal, Quebec, Canada, with a BA in English. From 1965 to 1969, he was at Princeton University in the Department of Comparative Literature, with education in Medieval British Literature, German, Russian, and French. Furr received his Ph.D degree from Princeton University in 1979. Since February 1970, he has been on the faculty at Montclair State University in New Jersey, where he specializes in Medieval English literature.

Beliefs

Holodomor
In a CounterPunch article published in March 2017, Furr argues that "[t]here was a very serious famine in the USSR, including (but not limited to) the Ukrainian SSR, in 1932-33. But there has never been any evidence of a 'Holodomor' or 'deliberate famine,' and there is none today. The 'Holodomor' fiction was invented by Ukrainian Nazi collaborators who found havens in Western Europe, Canada, and the USA after the war."

Moscow Trials
Contrary to the widely accepted view that the Moscow Trials were a series of show trials held at the instigation of Joseph Stalin between 1936 and 1938 against Trotskyists and members of Right Opposition of the Communist Party of the Soviet Union, Furr believes that all defendants in the Moscow Trials were at least guilty of what they were charged, as argued in a 2017 article for Journal of Labor and Society, a quarterly journal published by Brill.

Molotov–Ribbentrop Pact
In 2012, Furr stated that the Molotov–Ribbentrop Pact was signed by the Soviet Union to preserve an independent Poland rather than planning a partition of Poland, as was in fact stipulated in the secret protocol of the Molotov–Ribbentrop Pact between Nazi Germany and the Soviet Union. Furr argues that Britain and France also signed the Munich Agreement, a nonaggression pact with Germany that partitioned another state and that Poland too took part in the partition of Czechoslovakia, making the Soviet Union not unique in its signing of a non-aggression pact with Germany. Furr criticises the Polish government in exile, arguing that it should have remained somewhere in Poland "at least long enough to surrender" or could have fled to Britain or France rather than in neutral Romania. In Furr's words, "[a] 'rump' Poland might finally have agreed to make a mutual defense pact that included the USSR. That would have restarted 'collective security', the anti-Nazi alliance between the Western Allies and the USSR that the Soviets sought but UK and French leaders rejected." According to Furr, this would have "greatly weakened Hitler; probably eliminating much of the Jewish Holocaust; certainly preventing the conquest of France, Belgium, and the rest of Europe; [and] certainly prevented many millions of deaths of Soviet citizens".

Soviet invasion of Poland
Regarding the Soviet invasion of Poland in September 1939, Furr stated in 2009 that the Soviet Union did not actually invade the Second Polish Republic because Poland no longer had a government and was not a state according to international law, further stating that "at the time it was widely acknowledged that no such invasion occurred." Furr believes that the state Poland no longer existed because the Polish government was interned in Romania, although it continued to be recognized by all Allied powers. According to Furr, the Polish government did not declare war on the Soviet Union and only declared war on Nazi Germany, as did Britain and France. Britain did not demand the Soviet Union to withdraw its troops and France had a mutual defense treaty with Poland. Secondly, the Polish General Inspector of the Armed Forces Edward Rydz-Śmigły ordered Polish soldiers not to fight the Soviets and instead to continue fighting the Germans while the Polish president Ignacy Mościcki, who was interned in Romania since September 17, 1939, tacitly admitted that Poland no longer had a government and maintained its stance of neutrality. Finally, Furr notes that the League of Nations did not determine the Soviet Union had invaded a member state and accepted the Soviet declaration of neutrality while it voted to expel the Soviets when the Soviet Union attacked Finland in the Winter War.

Katyn Massacre
Contrary to the historical consensus and as stated by both the Soviet Union (in 1991) and the Russian Federation (in 2004), Furr denies Soviet complicity in the Katyn massacre, arguing in a 2013 article in the Socialism and Democracy academic peer-reviewed journal that the Katyn massacre was committed by the Nazi Schutzstaffel rather than by the Soviet NKVD. In 2010, Furr stated to have believed the widely accepted view until the discoveries in the mass graves at Volodymyr-Volynskyi, which he claims prove his thesis. According to Furr, some Poles that were implicated in Polish war crimes against Soviet POWs during 1919–1921, were likely killed by the Soviets while Nazis shot the others later. Furr cites a 1985 interview of Lazar Kaganovich in which he stated that the Soviets shot 3,200 Poles – all of whom were guilty of capital crimes. In a 2020 article in the Cultural Logic academic peer-reviewed journal criticized George Sanford's and Anna M. Cienciala's conventional books on Katyn and dismissed many of their statements as having no evidence.

"Secret Speech"
Furr's book Khrushchev Lied, subtitled "The Evidence that Every Revelation of Stalin's (and Beria's) Crimes in Nikita Khrushchev's Infamous Secret Speech to the 20th Party Congress of the Communist Party of the Soviet Union on February 25, 1956, Is Provably False", attacked the speech given by Nikita Khrushchev called "On the Cult of Personality and Its Consequences", more commonly referred to in the West as the "Secret Speech" because it was delivered at an unpublicized closed session of party delegates, with guests and members of the press excluded. According to Sven-Eric Holmstrom, "Furr identifies 61 allegations in Khrushchev's speech. He concludes that, with only one minor exception, every one of them is demonstrably false. In essence Furr claims to have proven that this 'speech of the century' is a fraud from beginning to end."

According to a review by Gregory Elich in the Marxist academic journal Science & Society, "it would be too much to expect from Furr to live up to his claim that not one specific statement by Khrushschev turned out to be true", that Furr's dislike of Khrushschev "often interferes with his analysis," and that the arguments by Furr about all defendants of Moscow Trials being guilty do not survive fact checking. Elich writes that "Furr demolishes Khrushchev's points" regarding the assessment of Stalin as a wartime commander. Elich concludes that the quotations from previously unavailable archival sources redeem the book. According to a review by Sven-Eric Holmstrom in the academic journal Socialism and Democracy, some of the assertions by Furr can be supported by writings by historians of the "revisionist school" of Communist and Soviet studies, such as J. Arch Getty, Mark Tauger, Stephen Wheatcroft, and Yuri Zhukov. Among them are assertions by Furr that, contrary to the speech by Khrushchev, Stalin did not encourage a cult of personality, that the Holodomor as a genocide was disproven, that Stalin was not a dictator and fought to make elections in the Soviet Union truly democratic, and that Leon Trotsky was guilty of plans to assassinate Stalin. While stating that "the book has some formal weaknesses", Holmstrom declared it to be a valuable contribution to the so-called "historical revisionist" school of Soviet and Communist studies and that "Furr is formally proclaiming a 'paradigm shift' for which evidence has been accumulating over many years. Furr's (and Bobrov's) work may be seen as building on that of the 'revisionists' (called 'Young Turks' when they first appeared in the mid-80s).

In May 2014, Furr held a talk at the Chinese Academy of Social Sciences on the subject of what Furr claims were lies by Khrushchev in the Secret Speech.

Reception
Historians John Earl Haynes and Harvey Klehr stated that Furr "lauded the creation of Communist regimes" in Europe and Asia because "billions of workers all over the world are exploited, murdered, tortured, oppressed by capitalism." In response to Furr's critical review, historian Gerald Meyer of Hostos Community College wrote that "Furr defends the Soviet state's expulsion of the Volga Germans, Tartars, Chechens, and other ethnic minorities from their homelands", "objects to my contention that collectivization of agriculture resulted in widespread resistance and famine", and "spends most of his energy attempting to refute the truism that Stalin was aware of and approved of huge numbers of political executions."

Furr's books, especially those on the Katyn massacre, have been cited in Russia as confirmation that the revisionist views are also supported by foreign historians. Cathy Young, describing Furr in an article for The Daily Beast as "a 'revisionist' on a career-long quest to exonerate Stalin", said that Furr's work, along with that of Douglas Tottle, was being used as part of a larger propaganda campaign by the Russian government to muddy the waters and obfuscate the history of Soviet crimes.

Historian Jarosław Szarek, president of the Polish Institute of National Remembrance, condemned Furr's work as denying Soviet war crimes, comparing it to "the scandalous manifestations of Holocaust denial." The comparison to Holocaust denial was itself criticized as unwise because Poland's education minister Anna Zelewska indirectly denied Polish complicity in the Jedwabne pogrom, a massacre of Polish Jews in July 1941.

During a public debate at a university campus in 2012, Furr was quoted as saying: "I have yet to find one crime — yet to find one crime — that Stalin committed. ... I know they all say he killed 20, 30, 40 million people — it is bullshit. ... Goebbels said that the Big Lie is successful and this is the Big Lie: that the Communists — that Stalin killed millions of people and that socialism is no good." Both The American Conservative and the Washington Examiner wrote that Furr referred to Nazi propaganda because a mediator of the discussion suggested that Furr was using tactics invented by Joseph Goebbels.

According to British journalist John O'Sullivan writing for National Review, Furr is "a 'historian' who denies that Stalin committed any crimes at all. [...] On reading this, my first reaction was that Grover Furr must be a fictional character or teasing Internet hoax. Revisionist historians nostalgic for 'really existing socialism' have long sought to minimize the number of Stalin's victims and the scale of Soviet crimes. But the extravagance of Furr's claims — every accusation against Stalin false! — made it hard to take them seriously. They amount less to revisionism than to outright denial of historical reality."

Controversial conservative author David Horowitz, known for compiling lists of professors he regards as “dangerous” and “anti-American”, listed Furr as one of the "101 most dangerous academics in America" for "venting his Stalinist and anti-American political passions on his helpless students" by claiming that the United States got what it deserved on September 11 and misinforming his students by claims like the United States being behind the attempted assassination of Pope John Paul II. Horowitz also criticized Furr for believing that "it was morally wrong for the United States to bring about the collapse of the Soviet Union".

Furr has been accused of academic malpractice by conservative professor Ronald Radosh, who called for his firing from Montclair State University and argued that “tenure should not be used to protect his employment”. Radosh writes “Grover Furr is not a distinguished scholar. He is a pedantic hack; a man who pretends to disprove with scores of footnotes all of his ideological opponents — as if endless citations prove that he is right — indeed anyone who casts aspersion on his beloved hero Joseph Stalin. If Furr uses his classroom to make these same arguments, as readily appears to be the case, it is a different matter. In the 1950s, in a seminal essay, the late philosopher Sidney Hook argued that while a Communist had a right to his opinions and to enter them in the marketplace of ideas, he did not have the right to be hired by a university to teach these ideas as the truth, and to use the classroom as an arena to indoctrinate students with lies meant to affirm the viability of the movement to which he has sworn loyalty.”

Bibliography

Books

Articles

References

External links

1944 births
Living people
People from Washington, D.C.
American communists
American Marxists
Writers about the Soviet Union
Historical negationism
Neo-Stalinism
Princeton University alumni
McGill University alumni
Montclair State University faculty
Holodomor deniers